The Brentwood Public Library is a public library in Brentwood, Missouri, a suburb of St. Louis.  Established in 1938, the library holds more than 53,000 items. It offers several activities and services for all ages.

It is a member of the Municipal Library Consortium of St. Louis County, nine independent libraries in St. Louis County.

References

External links
 
 Libraries.org | https://librarytechnology.org/library/20310

Public libraries in Missouri
Libraries in Greater St. Louis
Municipal Library Consortium of St. Louis County
Library buildings completed in 1938
1938 establishments in Missouri